The cunner (Tautogolabrus adspersus), also known as the blue perch, bergall, chogset, choggie, conner or sea perch, is a species of wrasse native to the northwestern Atlantic, where it is found from the Gulf of St. Lawrence and Newfoundland to the Chesapeake Bay. They  spend the winter months in a state of torpor underneath rocks. They can also be found in the aquarium trade.

Often, cunner is found mixed in with tautogs, living on or near the same structures. Much of the food eaten by those bergall living among blackfish are the leftovers from the blackfishes prey.  They can be distinguished from the tautog by their pointed snouts. Cunners are generally smaller, so are usually thrown back by anglers who think they caught a "short" tautog. In past years, they have been important commercial fish, but now are considered pests.  They can be confused with black sea bass, rockfish and other grouper, as well as tautog, for their ability to change color. 

Cunner can enter a hypometabolic state in response to cold temperatures and hypoxic conditions. In Newfoundland, Canada, cunner have been recorded entering a dormant state in Autumn, when temperatures fall below 5°C, and remaining dormant until May/June.  

Tautogolabrus adspersus is currently the only known member of its genus.

On May 28, 2015, the NJDEP Division of Fish and Wildlife  officially certified the catch of a new state record saltwater fish, weighing 3 pounds, 2.4 ounces and eclipsing the previous state record by 1.9 ounces. It measured 16.5" in length and had a girth of 12.5".

References

 Gulf of Maine Research Institute

Labridae
Monotypic fish genera
Fish described in 1792